John Gioia is an American politician. He has served on the Contra Costa County Board of Supervisors in Contra Costa County, California since 1998 and was re-elected three times. He served as chair in 2002, 2006 and 2010. John Gioia is a Democrat. Contra Costa supervisorial seats are non-partisan.

History
John Gioia was first elected to the Contra Costa Board of Supervisors in 1998, after successfully challenging incumbent Jim Rogers, and was re-elected three times. He served as chair due to the regular rotation of the role amongst the Supervisors in 2002, 2006 and 2010.

Gioia represents 210,000 residents in the westernmost urban area of the county including El Cerrito, Richmond, San Pablo, Pinole, and the unincorporated communities of El Sobrante, Kensington, Montalvin Manor, North Richmond, East Richmond Heights, Rollingwood and Tara Hills.

Gioia is a recognized leader in Bay Area regional government on air quality issues. He was appointed by Governor Brown to serve on the California Air Resources Board in 2012 and has served on the Bay Area Air Quality Management District Board since 2006 (serving as chair in 2012).

Gioia advocates on behalf of county government as the President of the California State Association of Counties. He chairs the Bay Area Joint Policy Committee (which coordinates the planning for the four regional government agencies), and serves as vice-chair of the San Francisco Bay Restoration Authority and previously served on the Doctors Medical Center governing board before its demise. Gioia also serves on the California Cities Counties Schools Partnership Board, Association of Bay Area Governments executive board, San Francisco Bay Conservation and Development Commission, Bay Area Regional Airport Planning Committee, RYSE Youth Center Board, El Sobrante Boys and Girls Club Advisory Board, and the Bay Area Social Equity Caucus Steering Committee.

Gioia was first elected to public office in 1988 as a Director of the East Bay Municipal Utility District (EBMUD) serving for 10 years and was EBMUD's youngest ever President in 1995.

He joined congressman then George Miller, Richmond city councilman Nat Bates and others in protesting the eviction of a popular pastor in 2010.

In 2016 he opposed development in landslide prone areas of rural and unincorporated El Sobrante Valley.

In 2017 he was involved in a feud with the county sheriff over expansion of West County Detention Center in Richmond, which he opposed, in the end he ended up creating a re-entry program for justice involved people that the sheriff also opposed. He also supported more affordable housing supported by 15 bills signed into law by Jerry Brown this year.

In 2018 he helped launch a deportation defense hotline for illegal aliens living in the area to help them with available resources.

Similar to the issue in 2010 in 2019 alongside congressman Mark DeSaulnier he urged a retirement home in San Pablo and its landlord to extend the stay for its many elderly residents.
Also in 2019 he criticized the NuStar refinery in Crockett for taking 48-minutes to call 911 emergency for a major out of control fire at its facility. He also supports Kensington remaining unincorporated citing its minor tax base but supporting its limited self-governance.

Indian gaming
Gioia is largely opposed to the expansion of urban gaming proposed by Native American Indian gaming interests. These projects include the failed billion dollar Point Molate proposal, Casino San Pablo upgrades from card club to full scale, and the successful Sugar Bowl Casino by the Guideville, Lytton, and Scotts Valley bands of Pomo Indians respectively.

Political career
In 1999 he voiced criticism of four refineries in the county particularly the Chevron Richmond Refinery for not having written policies on disaster response including the accidental release of contaminants.

In 2003 Gioia joined Loni Hancock, Irma Anderson, and other area residents and politicians to protest and oppose the entry of Wal-Mart into Hilltop Mall, however this was eventually unsuccessful.

In 2005 he proposed banning new Indian Reservations and gambling institutions in the county and also approved a measure to fine each supervisor $1 for every instance of bureaucratic mumbo jumbo.

In 2017, the California Fair Political Practices Commission recommended a $14,000 fine for Gioia, levied for missed deadlines in filing multiple documents related to campaign contributions and expenditures.

In 2018, Gioia travelled out of the country on a refinery junket to visit petroleum tar sands as a guest of oil companies.

Personal life
He is an alumnus of El Cerrito High School and Cal Berkeley where he received a bachelor's degree in political science. This was followed by a J.D. degree from Boalt Hall and a working career in business and land use law in his hometown and San Francisco. In 2002, Gioia married Jennifer Peck, who served as his treasurer before their legal separation in 2013 and divorce in 2016. Gioia lives in Richmond and is the parent of Christopher, a student at U.C. Berkeley, and Emilia, who attends a local public school.

Notes

External links
Official page

County supervisors in California
Year of birth missing (living people)
Living people
Politicians from Richmond, California
UC Berkeley School of Law alumni
People from El Cerrito, California